The Pomme de Terre River is a  tributary of the Minnesota River in western Minnesota in the United States. The headwaters region of the Pomme de Terre River is the northernmost extremity of the Minnesota River's watershed.

Etymology
The name Pomme de Terre is French and means literally "soil apple," usually meaning "potato." In this case, the river was named by early French explorers for a different root vegetable, the potato-like prairie turnip (Psoralea esculenta), which was commonly eaten by the Sioux.

Geography

The Pomme de Terre River issues from Stalker Lake in Tordenskjold Township, approximately three miles (5 km) northeast of Dalton in southern Otter Tail County, and flows generally southwardly through eastern Grant and Stevens Counties and western Swift County, through the cities of Barrett, Morris, and Appleton.  It flows into Marsh Lake on the Minnesota River in southwestern Swift County, approximately four miles (6 km) southwest of Appleton.  Marsh Lake was formed by a backup of water caused by the Pomme de Terre's delta, and is presently maintained by a manmade dam.

In its upper course the river flows through a morainic region of numerous lakes, in a course characterized by meadows and wooded hills, as well as marshy stretches near areas where the river passes through lakes.  The largest lakes on the river include Ten Mile Lake in Otter Tail  County; Pomme de Terre and Barrett Lakes in Grant County; and Perkins Lake in Stevens County.  The water levels of several lakes on the river's course are maintained by small dams.  Downstream of Morris, the river flows on till plains between eroding banks and becomes increasingly turbid.  According to the Minnesota Pollution Control Agency, approximately 81% of the land in the Pomme de Terre River's watershed is used for agriculture; of this area, half is used for the cultivation of corn and soybeans, and 43% for that of hay and small grains.

Flow rate
At the United States Geological Survey's stream gauge in Appleton, eight miles (13 km) upstream from the river's mouth, the annual mean flow of the river between 1931 and 2005 was 132 cubic feet per second (4 m³/s).  The highest recorded flow during the period, resulting in part from a dam failure, was 8,890 ft³/s (252 m³/s) on April 7, 1997.  Readings of zero were recorded on numerous days during several years.

See also
List of rivers in Minnesota

References

External links
Real-Time Water Data for Pomme de Terre River at Appleton

Rivers of Minnesota
Tributaries of the Minnesota River
Rivers of Grant County, Minnesota
Rivers of Otter Tail County, Minnesota
Rivers of Stevens County, Minnesota
Rivers of Swift County, Minnesota